Morgan Sportès is a French writer. He was born in Algiers in 1947. The author of more than 20 books, he has won the Prix Renaudot des lycéens (2006) for Maos, and the Prix Interallié (2011) and the Globes de Cristal (2012) for his novel Tout, tout de suite. Another novel L'Appât (1990) was turned into an award-winning movie by Bertrand Tavernier.

References

1947 births
French male novelists
Living people
Prix Interallié winners
Prix Renaudot des lycéens winners